Aida   is a 1987 Swedish movie, directed by Claes Fellbom. The film is based on Giuseppe Verdi's opera, Aida.

Kerstin Nerbe was responsible for reworking the music. The film is built on a performance at the Stockholm Folk Opera in 1985.

Cast
 - Aida
 - Radames
 - voice of Radames
Ingrid Tobiasson - Amneris
 - Amonasro
 - Ramfis
 - the King's spokesman
Françoise Drapier - High priestess
 - voice of the high priestess
 -  Messenger
 - voice of Messenger
 - dancer
 - dancer
Ann Lee - dancer
 - dancer
 - dancer
Björn Wikström - dancer
Ross - moderator

Music
 Aida, by composer Giuseppe Verdi
Italian lyrics by Antonio Ghislanzoni and Swedish lyrics (1880) by Herbert Sundberg.

References
This article is based on a translation of the corresponding article in Swedish.

External links

1987 films
1980s musical films
Swedish musical films
1980s Swedish-language films
Films based on operas
Films shot in Sweden
1980s Italian-language films
Films set in ancient Egypt
Opera films
Filmed stage productions
Giuseppe Verdi
1987 multilingual films
Swedish multilingual films
1980s Swedish films